is a military aerodrome of the Japan Air Self-Defense Force . It is located in Tsuiki, Fukuoka Prefecture, Japan.

History
Tsuiki Airfield was originally built by the Imperial Japanese Army Air Force (IJAAF) during World War II. The airfield was attacked by United States Army Air Force's Fifth Air Force B-24 Liberator and A-26 Invader bombers on 7 August 1945, largely destroying the base and incapacitating the airfield for operational use.

Not rebuilt in the immediate postwar era, the old IJAAF airfield was pressed into use during the early days of the Korean War, when the United States Air Force (USAF) 8th Fighter Group moved F-51 Mustangs to Tsuiki in mid-August 1950 for operations over the South Korean Pusan Perimeter. When airfields became available in South Korea, the unit moved to Suwon Air Base to conduct ground support operations.

In addition, the 35th Fighter Group, one of the first USAF units deployed to South Korea, pulled out of the line for F-51 replacement aircraft and personnel R&R at Tsuiki in mid-August. In October, it returned to the South Korean battlefield, moving with the 8th FG to Suwon AB.

After its reactivation, Tsuiki Air Base became a second-line USAF facility for the remainder of the Korean War, hosting several weather squadrons, with the 6169th Air Base Squadron being the main host support unit, and supervising construction of new runways and support buildings. After the combat in Korea ended in 1953, it remained a reserve base until being returned to Japanese control in June 1957.

Tenant units
 Japan Air Self-Defense Force Western Air Defense Force
 8th Air Wing
 6th Tactical Fighter Squadron (F-2A/B)
 8th Tactical Fighter Squadron (F-2A/B)
 2nd Air Defence Missile Group
 7th Fire Unit

References

 Maurer, Maurer (1983). Air Force Combat Units Of World War II. Maxwell AFB, Alabama: Office of Air Force History. .
 Ravenstein, Charles A. (1984). Air Force Combat Wings Lineage and Honors Histories 1947–1977. Maxwell AFB, Alabama: Office of Air Force History. .

The 18th FBG also used Tsuiki for F-86 aircraft overhaul and inspections -

External links
 Tsuiki Air Base

Airports in Japan
Transport in Fukuoka Prefecture
Japan Air Self-Defense Force bases
Airfields of the United States Army Air Forces in Occupied Japan
Buildings and structures in Fukuoka Prefecture